Golden Dance Classics is a split EP by Japanese artists Boris and 9dw (nine days wonder). It was released in 2009 on 12" split vinyl and CD by Catune, a record label in Tokyo, Japan.

A live version of "Tokyo Wonder Land" was released on Boris / Variations + Live in Japan, and an alternate studio mix was used on Attention Please. A studio re-recording of "Akirame Flower" is featured on the collaborative album with Merzbow, Gensho.

Track listing

External links
9dw Boris golden dance classics (CD) (CATUNE)

2009 EPs